Usin Kerim is a Bulgarian Romani poet. Kerim has come to prominence in the genre of Romani poetry over the past decade.

He was born in 1929 by the banks of the River Vit in Bulgaria, and composed "Birth in the Encampment" and other poems.

References

Romani poets
Bulgarian people of Romani descent
People from Teteven
1929 births
Living people